Ali Shamilevich Bagautinov (born June 10, 1985 in Dagestan) is a Russian professional mixed martial artist who competed in the Flyweight division of the Ultimate Fighting Championship.

Combat Sambo career
After years of competing in wrestling and sambo, Bagautinov became a world Combat Sambo champion in Minsk.

At the FIAS 2012 World Sambo Championships, Bagautinov defeated Belarusian Novitski Vladislav via decision (15-0) in the quarterfinals.  In the semifinals, Bagautinov defeated Kyrgyzian Razykov Alibek via TKO at 2:19 of the first round.  In the tournament final, Bagautinov defeated Kazakh Asset Sagyndykov via armbar submission at 0:35 of the first round.

Bagautinov was stripped of all FIAS awards and suspended from competition for two years (November 8, 2012 - November 8, 2014) after testing positive for methylhexanamine.

Mixed martial arts career

Early career
Bagautinov made his professional MMA debut in December 2009. He is a veteran of the Russian MMA promotion Fight Nights, where he compiled a record of 8-1. In 2013, Bagautinov was listed as one of the top flyweight prospects in all of MMA.

Ultimate Fighting Championship
It was announced in June 2013 that Bagautinov had signed a five-fight deal with the UFC.

In his UFC debut, Bagautinov faced Marcos Vinicius on September 4, 2013 at UFC Fight Night 28.  After a back-and-forth first two rounds, Bagautinov won the fight via TKO in the third round.

In his second fight for the promotion, Bagautinov fought Tim Elliott on November 16, 2013 at UFC 167. Bagautinov won the fight via unanimous decision.

Bagautinov fought John Lineker on February 1, 2014 at UFC 169. Bagautinov won the fight via unanimous decision.

Bagautinov faced Demetrious Johnson on June 14, 2014 at UFC 174 for the UFC Flyweight Championship. Bagautinov lost the fight via unanimous decision. Subsequent to his loss, on July 10, the British Columbia Athletic Commission (BCAC) announced that Bagautinov tested positive for erythropoietin (EPO) prior to the title fight. In response, the BCAC has suspended him from mixed martial arts competition for one year.

Bagautinov's first fight after serving his suspension was against Joseph Benavidez on October 3, 2015 at UFC 192. Bagautinov lost the fight via unanimous decision.

Bagautinov next faced Geane Herrera on June 18, 2016 at UFC Fight Night 89. Bagautinov won the fight via unanimous decision.

Bagautinov was expected to face Kyoji Horiguchi on October 15, 2016 at UFC Fight Night 97. However, the promotion announced on October 6 that they had cancelled the event entirely. In turn, the pairing was quickly rescheduled and took place on November 19, 2016 at UFC Fight Night 99. He lost the fight via unanimous decision.

It was announced on January 17, 2017 that Bagautinov had chosen not to renew his contract with the UFC.

Post-UFC career
As the first bout after the UFC, Bagautinov headlined Fight Nights Global 64: Nam vs. Bagautinov against Tyson Nam on April 27, 2017. He lost the bout via knockout in the third round.

He then faced Pedro Nobre at Fight Nights Global 69: Bagautinov vs. Nobre on June 30, 2017. He won the fight via second-round submission.

On September 23, 2018, Bagautinov faced Denis Oliveira Fontes Araujo at Battle of Volga 6 and won the fight via unanimous decision.

Brave Combat Federation
Bagautinov made his promotional debut in the Brave CF against Oleg Lichkovakha at Brave CF 46 on January 16, 2021. He won the fight via unanimous decision and subsequently joined Brave CF Flyweight tournament.

His first bout in the Flyweight tournament was a Quarter-final bout against fellow UFC veteran Dustin Ortiz on April 1, 2021 at Brave CF 50. He won a competitive bout via unanimous decision.

Bagautinov was scheduled to face José Torres in the Semi-final of the Flyweight tournament at Brave CF 55 on November 6, 2021. However due to difficulties making weight, Torres pulled out and was replaced by Sean Santella. He won the bout in the first round via ground and pound after defending successfully Santella's takedown attempt.

Championships and accomplishments

Mixed martial arts
Fight Nights Global
Fight Nights Flyweight Championship (One time)
Two successful title defenses

Federation of MMA of Samara 
FMMAS Flyweight Championship (One time)

Sambo
World Sambo Federation (Not FIAS)
World Combat Sambo Champion (Two times)
Europe Combat Sambo Champion
Combat Sambo Federation of Russia
Russian National Combat Sambo Champion (Five times)
Moscow Combat Sambo Champion (Three times)
Dagestan Combat Sambo Champion
Moscow Combat Sambo Cup Champion (Four times)

Pankration
Russian Federation of Pangration Athlima
Pankration Russian National Champion
Moscow Cup Champion (Three times)
World Pangration Athlima Federation
Pankration World Champion
Pankration World Cup Champion

Brazilian jiu-jitsu
Russian Federation of Brazilian jiu-jitsu
Russian National Brazilian jiu-jitsu Champion

Wrestling
Russian Wrestling Federation
Russian Greco-Roman Wrestling Master Rank Tournament Runner-up
Dagestan Freestyle Wrestling District Tournament Winner

Hand-to-hand combat
Russian Union of Martial Arts
Hand-to-hand Combat Dynamo Champion
Hand-to-hand Police Force Combat Medalist

Grappling
International Federation of Associated Wrestling Styles
Russian Grappling National Champion (Two times)
Moscow Grappling Cup Champion

Mixed martial arts record

|-
|Win
|align=center|22–7
|Sean Santella
|TKO (punches)
|Brave CF 55
|
|align=center|1
|align=center|1:01
|Rostov-on-Don, Russia
|
|-
|Win
|align=center|21–7
|Dustin Ortiz
|Decision (unanimous)
|Brave CF 50
|
|align=center|3
|align=center|5:00
|Arad, Bahrain
|
|-
|Win
|align=center|20–7
|Oleg Lichkovakha
|Decision (unanimous)
|Brave CF 46
|
|align=center|3
|align=center|5:00
|Sochi, Russia
|
|-
|Loss
|align=center|19–7
|Zhalgas Zhumagulov
|Decision (split)
|Fight Nights Global 95: Bagautinov vs. Zhumagulov
|
|align=center|5
|align=center|5:00
|Sochi, Russia
|
|-
|Win
|align=center|19–6
|Vartan Asatryan
|Decision (unanimous)
|Fight Nights Global 92: Bagautinov vs. Asatryan
|
|align=center|5
|align=center|5:00
|Moscow, Russia
|
|-
|Win
|align=center|18–6
|Denis Araujo Oliveira Fontes
|Decision (unanimous)
|Samara MMA Federation: Battle of Volga 6
|
|align=center|3
|align=center|5:00
|Samara, Russia
|
|-
|Win
|align=center|17–6
|Andy Young
|Decision (unanimous)
|Fight Nights Global 84: Deák vs. Chupanov
|
|align=center|3
|align=center|5:00
|Bratislava, Slovakia
|
|-
|Win
|align=center|16–6
|Danny Martinez
|Decision (unanimous)
|Fight Nights Global 76: Bagautinov vs. Martinez
|
|align=center|5
|align=center|5:00
|Krasnodar, Russia
|
|-
|Win
|align=center|15–6
|Pedro Nobre
|Submission (rear-naked choke)
|Fight Nights Global 69: Bagautinov vs. Nobre
|
|align=center|2
|align=center|3:51
|Novosibirsk, Russia
|
|-
|Loss
|align=center|14–6
|Tyson Nam
|KO (head kick)
|Fight Nights Global 64: Nam vs. Bagautinov
|
|align=center|3
|align=center|4:59
|Moscow, Russia
|
|-
|Loss
|align=center|14–5
|Kyoji Horiguchi
|Decision (unanimous)
|UFC Fight Night: Mousasi vs. Hall 2
|
|align=center|3
|align=center|5:00
|Belfast, Northern Ireland
| 
|-
|Win
|align=center|14–4
|Geane Herrera
|Decision (unanimous)
|UFC Fight Night: MacDonald vs. Thompson
|
|align=center|3
|align=center|5:00
|Ottawa, Ontario, Canada
|
|-
|Loss
|align=center|13–4
|Joseph Benavidez
|Decision (unanimous)
|UFC 192
|
|align=center|3
|align=center|5:00
|Houston, Texas, United States
|
|-
|Loss
|align=center|13–3
|Demetrious Johnson
|Decision (unanimous)
|UFC 174
|
|align=center|5
|align=center|5:00
|Vancouver, British Columbia, Canada
|
|-
|Win
|align=center|13–2
|John Lineker
|Decision (unanimous)
|UFC 169
|
|align=center|3
|align=center|5:00
|Newark, New Jersey, United States
|
|-
|Win
|align=center|12–2
|Tim Elliott
|Decision (unanimous)
|UFC 167
|
|align=center|3
|align=center|5:00
|Las Vegas, Nevada, United States
|
|-
|Win
|align=center|11–2
|Marcos Vinicius
|KO (punches)
|UFC Fight Night: Teixeira vs. Bader
|
|align=center|3
|align=center|3:28
|Belo Horizonte, Brazil
|
|-
|Win
|align=center|10–2
|Seiji Ozuka
|TKO (punches)
|Fight Nights - Battle of Moscow 11
|
|align=center|1
|align=center|0:25
|Moscow, Russia
|
|-
|Win
|align=center|9–2
|Andreas Bernhard
|TKO (punches)
|Fight Nights - Battle of Moscow 9
|
|align=center|1
|align=center|0:27
|Moscow, Russia
|
|-
|Win
|align=center|8–2
|Vadim Zhlobich
|Submission (guillotine choke)
|Fight Nights - Battle of Desne
|
|align=center|2
|align=center|1:01
|Bryansk, Russia
|
|-
|Win
|align=center|7–2
|Mikael Silander
|Decision (unanimous)
|Fight Nights - Battle of Moscow 7
|
|align=center|2
|align=center|5:00
|Moscow, Russia
|
|-
|Win
|align=center|6–2
|Vitaly Maksimov
|Submission (rear-naked choke)
|Fight Nights - Battle in Kalmykia
|
|align=center|1
|align=center|2:50
|Elista, Russia
|
|-
|Win
|align=center|5–2
|Zharkyn Baizakov
|Decision (unanimous)
|Fight Nights - Battle of Moscow 6
|
|align=center|2
|align=center|5:00
|Moscow, Russia
|
|-
|Win
|align=center|4–2
|Vitaliy Panteleev
|TKO (punches)
|Fight Nights - Battle of Moscow 5
|
|align=center|1
|align=center|4:07
|Moscow, Russia
|
|-
|Win
|align=center|3–2
|Asan Aysabekov
|TKO (punches)
|Fight Nights - The Fights With and Without Rules
|
|align=center|1
|align=center|2:06
|Moscow, Russia
|
|-
|Loss
|align=center|2–2
|Evgeniy Lazukov
|Decision (unanimous)
|FWR - Fights With Rules 2
|
|align=center|3
|align=center|5:00
|Ufa, Russia
|
|-
|Loss
|align=center|2–1
|Vitaliy Panteleev
|Decision (split)
|Fight Nights - Battle of Moscow 3
|
|align=center|2
|align=center|5:00
|Moscow, Russia
|
|-
|Win
|align=center|2–0
|Dmitry Kazancev
|Submission (armbar)
|World Absolute FC
|
|align=center|1
|align=center|1:34
|Cheboksary, Russia
|
|-
|Win
|align=center|1–0
|Aslan Margushev
|Submission (armbar)
|Challenge Cup
|
|align=center|2
|align=center|2:13
|Kolomna, Russia
|

Professional boxing record

| style="text-align:center;" colspan="8"|2 Wins (0 knockouts, 2 decisions), 0 Losses, 0 Draws
|-
|align=center style="border-style: none none solid solid; background: #e3e3e3"|Res.
|align=center style="border-style: none none solid solid; background: #e3e3e3"|Record
|align=center style="border-style: none none solid solid; background: #e3e3e3"|Opponent
|align=center style="border-style: none none solid solid; background: #e3e3e3"|Type
|align=center style="border-style: none none solid solid; background: #e3e3e3"|Rd., Time
|align=center style="border-style: none none solid solid; background: #e3e3e3"|Date
|align=center style="border-style: none none solid solid; background: #e3e3e3"|Location
|align=center style="border-style: none none solid solid; background: #e3e3e3"|Notes
|-
| style="background: Win
| align=center|2–0
|  Andrei Kalechits
| align=center|UD
| align=center|4
| align=center|2020-11-02
|  Falcon Club, Minsk, Belarus
|
|-
| style="background: Win
| align=center|1–0
|  Anton Bekish
| align=center|UD
| align=center|4
| align=center|2013-06-21
|  Krylatskoe Sport Palace, Moscow, Moscow Oblast
|
|-

International combat sambo record

|-
|align="center" style = "background: #f0f0f0"| Record
| align="center" style="border-style: none none solid solid; background: #f0f0f0"|Result
| align="center" style="border-style: none none solid solid; background: #f0f0f0"|Opponent
| align="center" style="border-style: none none solid solid; background: #f0f0f0"|Method
| align="center" style="border-style: none none solid solid; background: #f0f0f0"|Event
| align="center" style="border-style: none none solid solid; background: #f0f0f0"|Date
| align="center" style="border-style: none none solid solid; background: #f0f0f0"|Round
| align="center" style="border-style: none none solid solid; background: #f0f0f0"|Time
| align="center" style="border-style: none none solid solid; background: #f0f0f0"|Notes
|-
|3–0
|Win||  Asset Sagyndykov|| Submission (armbar) ||  World Sambo Championships (Flyweight Division) || 2012|| 1 || 0:35  || International Master of Sports Final 
|-
|2–0
|Win||  Razykov Alibek|| TKO (retirement) || World Sambo Championships (Flyweight Division) || 2012|| 1 || 2:19 || International Master of Sports Semifinal 
|-
|1–0
|Win||   Vladislav Novitski|| Points (15–0) || World Sambo Championships (Flyweight Division) || 2012|| 2 || 5:00 || International Master of Sports Quarterfinal 
|-

See also
 List of current UFC fighters
 List of male mixed martial artists

References

External links 
Official UFC Profile

Russian male mixed martial artists
Dagestani mixed martial artists
Dargwa people
Doping cases in mixed martial arts
Living people
1985 births
Russian expatriates in the United States
Flyweight mixed martial artists
Russian sambo practitioners
Russian sportspeople in doping cases
Russian practitioners of Brazilian jiu-jitsu
Russian male boxers
Ultimate Fighting Championship male fighters
Mixed martial artists utilizing sambo
Mixed martial artists utilizing pankration
Mixed martial artists utilizing freestyle wrestling
Mixed martial artists utilizing Greco-Roman wrestling
Mixed martial artists utilizing boxing
Mixed martial artists utilizing ARB
Mixed martial artists utilizing Brazilian jiu-jitsu
People from Kizlyar